Dying Laughing is a 2016 documentary film about the complicated lives of stand-up comedians and discussing all aspects of their work.

Cast

Release 
The documentary premiered at the 2016 Los Angeles Film Festival in Culver City, California. It was later released for wider audiences on February 24, 2017.

Reception
The review aggregator website Rotten Tomatoes surveyed  and, categorizing the reviews as positive or negative, assessed 18 as positive and 4 as negative for a 82 percent rating. Among the reviews, it determined an average rating of 6.30 out of 10. For The Guardian, Gwilym Mumford gave the documentary a 3 out of 5, stating, "the endless conveyor belt of talking heads does rather lose its lustre over time, and some actual standup would've been welcome, but there's a real dizzying amount of insight, not to mention a real poignancy to some of the contributors".

References

External links
 
 

2016 comedy films
2016 documentary films
American documentary films
Stand-up comedy
Films scored by Edward Shearmur
2010s English-language films
2010s American films